Farnham Heath End School is a mixed coeducational secondary school with academy status, in Heath End, Surrey, with roughly 900 pupils (987 as of 2021).

About
In April 2013 the school became a Specialist Mathematics and Computing College. The school has "Healthy School" status and is accredited as an "Investor in People". It converted to an academy in 2013.

Ofsed Inspection judgements

 2011: Satisfactory
 2012: Good
 2016: Requires Improvement
 2020: Good

Houses
The houses are named after Farnham people.:

New houses were introduced in 2018. The previous houses were Nightingale, Owens, Austen and Brunel.

Senior leadership team

Year leaders

Alumni

 Joel Freeland, basketball player
 Kylie Grimes, para-athlete 
 Carole Hersee, the Test Card Girl
 Jann Turner, film director, novelist, television director and screenwriter
 Ella Chandler, cricketer

References

External links 
Official School Website

Secondary schools in Surrey
Academies in Surrey
Farnham